Kryvyi Rih urban territorial hromada is a hromada (municipality) in central Ukraine, in Kryvyi Rih Raion of Dnipropetrovsk Oblast. The administrative center is the city of Kryvyi Rih. The municipality is governed by a mayor and city council which work cooperatively to ensure the smooth-running of the city and procure its municipal bylaws. The city's budget is also controlled by the administration.

Administratively, until 2020, Kryvyi Rih was designated the city of oblast significance, which placed the municipality at the same level of administration as that of a raion, and thus directly subordinate to the oblast. On 18 July 2020, as part of the administrative reform of Ukraine, the number of raions of Dnipropetrovsk Oblast was reduced to seven, and the status of Kryvyi Rih Municipality was subordinated directly to the enlarged Kryvyi Rih Raion.

Settlements 
The municipality consists of 1 city (Kryvyi Rih) and 5 villages.

Jurisdiction
Kryvyi Rih Municipality is divided into seven administrative urban raions (city districts), each with its own administrative bodies subordinate to the municipality:
 Metalurhiinyi District
 City Center District
 Ternivskyi District
 Saksahanskyi District
 Inhuletskyi District
 Pokrovskyi District
 Dovhyntsivskyi District

The municipality and its urban raions include the settlements of:

Cities:
 Kryvyi Rih proper

Rural Settlements:
 Avanhard
 Hirnytske
 Kolomiitseve

Villages:
 Novoivanivka
 Ternuvatyi Kut

Mayors

Assembly members
The City Council Assambly of the city makes up the administration's legislative branch, thus effectively making it a city 'parliament' or rada. The municipal council is made up of 90 elected members, who are each elected to represent a certain district of the city for a four-year term. The current council is the sixth in the city's modern history, and was elected in 2010. In the regular meetings of the municipal council, problems facing the city are discussed, and annually the city's budget is drawn up. The council has 33 standing commissions which play an important role in controlling the finances and trading practices of the city and its merchants.

Services and facilities 
Notable services provided and facilities managed by Kryvyi Rih City Council include:

 Kryvyi Rih International Airport
 Kryvyi Rih Metrotram
 Trams in Kryvyi Rih
 Trolleybuses in Kryvyi Rih
 Chervoniy Gіrnik
 Rudana TV

References

Hromadas of Dnipropetrovsk Oblast
2020 establishments in Ukraine